The following are lists of clusters:
 List of galaxy groups and clusters
 List of open clusters
 List of globular clusters

See also 
 List of superclusters